The John Trumbull Birthplace, also known as the Governor Jonathan Trumbull House, is a historic house museum on the Lebanon Green in Lebanon, Connecticut.  Built in 1735 by Joseph Trumbull as a wedding present for his son Jonathan (1710–1785), the house was a center of political and military strategy during the American Revolutionary War, when Jonathan Trumbull was Governor of Connecticut.  It was also the birthplace of John Trumbull (1756–1843), an artist known for his depictions of the war and its people.  The house was designated a National Historic Landmark in 1965.

Description

The house is a -story wood-frame structure, five bays wide, with a side-gable roof, wooden clapboard siding, and a large central chimney.  Its centered entrance is flanked by fluted pilasters and topped by a transom window and an entablature.  Two ells extend back from the house, joining it to another small cottage, used as a caretaker's residence.  The first floor of the interior is divided into a parlor, dining room, and bedroom, with a kitchen and pantry in the ell.  The second floor, in addition to bedrooms, has a secret "bolthole" chamber which Governor Trumbull used as an office.  The house includes a selection of Trumbull possessions, as well as other period items.

History

Joseph Trumbull built the house in 1735, when his son Jonathan married Faith Robinson.  Jonathan Trumbull was elected governor of the Connecticut Colony in 1769, and became the first governor of the independent state of Connecticut in 1776.  One of Lebanon's leading citizens, he was also a successful merchant, managing his affairs from this house.  During the years of the American Revolutionary War (1775–1783) many meetings took place either here or in the adjacent War Office, which was originally connected to the house by a secret passage, and it functioned as a major logistical center for the northern states.  A troop of French Army cavalry was stationed on the Lebanon Green during the winter of 1780–1781, and these troops joined those of the Comte de Rochambeau when he marched through in 1781 en route to the Siege of Yorktown.

Jonathan's son John Trumbull was born in the house June 6, 1756. He served as an aide to George Washington in the war, and became an artist. He was commissioned by Congress in the 19th century to paint four of the eight historical paintings that adorn the United States Capitol rotunda.  He also painted portraits of many of the war's military leaders.

In 1830, the house was moved several hundred feet to its present location.  The Connecticut chapter of the Daughters of the American Revolution purchased the property in 1934, and have operated it since then as a historic house museum.  The property is open to the public on weekends from May through October.

The house was declared a National Historic Landmark in 1965, and listed on the National Register of Historic Places in 1966.

See also

 List of National Historic Landmarks in Connecticut
 March Route of Rochambeau's army
 List of historic sites preserved along Rochambeau's route
 National Register of Historic Places listings in New London County, Connecticut

References

External links
 Connecticut Daughters of the American Revolution
 Governor Trumbull House and Wadsworth Stable
 Governor Jonathan Trumbull House – Town of Lebanon
 

Houses in Lebanon, Connecticut
National Historic Landmarks in Connecticut
Museums in New London County, Connecticut
Houses completed in 1735
Trumbull, John Birthplace
Trumbull, John Birthplace
Historic places on the Washington–Rochambeau Revolutionary Route
National Register of Historic Places in New London County, Connecticut
Trumbull, John
Historic district contributing properties in Connecticut